The Hafei Minyi is a 7- to 8-seater Microvan made by Hafei, a Chinese carmaker.

First Generation

The first generation Hafei Minyi was launched in 2003 with a price starting at RMB 48,800. The first generation Hafei Minyi was the first self-developed domestic model of China. The Minyi uses unibody construction and features airbags for the driver and ABS, with 7-seater and 8-seater models available.

Miles ZX40ST electric truck
The Miles ZX40ST electric truck is an electric truck based on the Hafei Minyi pickup and debuted in Orlando in the summer of 2007. The truck is governed to a maximum speed of  an hour and was claimed to travel 50–60 miles per charge. Like the ZX40S Advanced Design, this truck also uses an advanced three phase, brushless, AC induction motor, which comes standard with regenerative braking and optional air conditioning. MSRP $19,900.

Hafei Minyi M408
The Hafei Minyi M408 is a variant based on the first generation Hafei Minyi focused on the passenger vehicle market with a price starting at RMB 36,300 and was launched during the 2006 Chengdu Auto Show. Dubbed the second generation Minyi, or Minyi II, the Minyi M408 is available with a range of petrol engines including a 1.0 liter, a 1.1 liter, and a 1.3-liter engine.

Styling wise, the Minyi M408 was designed by Italian design house Pininfarina.

Colombia
The first generation Hafei Minyi single cab and double cab pickups are available in Colombia starting from July 2012. They have a 1.1-liter engine and feature larger loading pans of up to 2.89 meters for the single cab model and 2.10 meters for the double cab model. Both Minyi pickup models are powered by a 1.1-liter inline-4 engine mated to five-speed manual gearboxes. The Minyi pickup also features mechanical steering, equipped with scanners, radio, tachometer, cloth cushioning, sun visor for the driver and front passenger, cigarette lighter, glove box, and a loading capacity of 815 kilograms in the single cab model and 565 kilograms in the double cab model. They are the largest capacities of their segment in the market. Prices of the pickups are $21,900,000 and $25,400,000 respectively.

Second Generation (Xin-Minyi)

A second generation model dubbed the Xin-Minyi was launched during the 2012 Beijing Auto Show.

The updated Hafei Minyi is available in 5 trim levels, with all of them powered by 1.0-liter gasoline engines. There are two versions of the engine, producing 48 hp and 60 hp respectively. The more powerful 1.0-liter engine produces 60 hp (44 kW)/5500rpm and 84Nm/3000-4000rpm. The only transmission is a 5-speed manual gearbox.

Colombia
The second generation Hafei Minyi was distributed in Colombia by Grupo China Automotriz. This van was launched as the cheapest option on the market as it comes in a panel van version at $19,900,000 with a load capacity of 650Kg. The top trim level is a 7 passenger model priced at $20,900,000.

The Colombia version of the Minyi has a 1.1-liter inline-4 engine and a 5-speed manual transmission. The Minyi also offers optional air Conditioning , CD radio, tachometer, fabric cushioning, sun visor for the driver and passenger, cigarette lighter, glove box, third stop and a warranty of 2 years or 30,000 kilometers for private use and 1 year or 50,000 for public service. As of September 2012, it was available in the dealership network of the China Automotive Group, which has been in the national market for more than 8 years with more than 18,000 vehicles rolling in Colombia.

References

2000s cars
Kei cars
Kei trucks
Rear-wheel-drive vehicles
Microvans
Cars of China
Cars introduced in 2003